Marcus E. Raichle (born March 15, 1937) is an American neurologist at the Washington University School of Medicine in Saint Louis, Missouri. He is a professor in the Department of Radiology with joint appointments in Neurology, Neurobiology and Biomedical Engineering.  His research over the past 40 years has focused on the nature of functional brain imaging signals arising from PET and fMRI and the application of these techniques to the study of the human brain in health and disease. He received the Kavli Prize in Neuroscience “for the discovery of specialized brain networks for memory and cognition", together with Brenda Milner and John O’Keefe in 2014.

Career
Noteworthy accomplishments of Marcus Raichle include the discovery of the relative independence of blood flow and oxygen consumption during changes in brain activity which provided the physiological basis of fMRI; the discovery of a default mode of brain function (i.e., organized intrinsic activity) and its signature system, the brain’s default mode network; and, the discovery that aerobic glycolysis contributes to brain function independent of oxidative phosphorylation.

Honors
 Member: National Academy of Sciences, Institute of Medicine, American Academy of Arts and Sciences
Foreign member: The Norwegian Academy of Science and Letters
 Fellow: American Association for the Advancement of Science

Awards
In 2001, he was a co-recipient of Grawemeyer Award in Psychology, with Michael Posner and Steven Petersen of the University of Louisville. In 2010, he was awarded the Metlife Foundation Award for Medical Research in Alzheimer's Disease along with Randy L. Buckner, and the Ariëns Kappers Medal from the Royal Netherlands Academy of Arts and Sciences. In 2014, he was a co-recipient of the Kavli Prize in Neuroscience, awarded by the Norwegian Academy of Science and Letters, with Brenda Milner of the Montreal Neurological Institute at McGill University and John O’Keefe of University College London.

Selected publications

References

External links

Official site

Living people
1937 births
American consciousness researchers and theorists
Attention
American physiologists
American cognitive neuroscientists
American neurologists
Behavioral neuroscientists
Members of the United States National Academy of Sciences
Kavli Prize laureates in Neuroscience
Members of the National Academy of Medicine